Bianca Voitek (born 15 November 1985) is a German female bodybuilder.

She has been successful at following bodybuilding contests:

2003 Daunaucup Women 1 : 2 placeNewcomer Women 1 : 2 place26. Oktober 2003 Int. Süddeutsche Meisterschaft Women 1 : 1 place2005 Süddeutschen Meisterschaft Women 3.place2005 Junior World Championship 4.place2008 Deutsche Meisterschaft 2.place2009 Süddeutsche Meisterschaft Women 2.place

source: https://web.archive.org/web/20090429120357/http://www.fibofoto.de/profiles/germany2/voitek/index.php4

1985 births
Living people
German female bodybuilders